Council Regulation (EC) No 3295/94 of 22 December 1994 laying down measures to prohibit the release for free circulation, export, re-export or entry for a suspensive procedure of counterfeit and pirated goods, or for short Customs Regulation 3295/94, is a European Union regulation modifying the Community Customs Code.

The EU Customs Regulation 1383/2003 came into force on July 1, 2004, and replaced the former Regulation 3295/94.

References

See also 
Directive on the enforcement of intellectual property rights (2004/48/EC)
Directive on criminal measures aimed at ensuring the enforcement of intellectual property rights (proposed)
Copyright law of the European Union
Community Trade Mark
European Union patent law
Copyright infringement

European Union customs regulations
1994 in law
1994 in the European Union